Udo Wagner (born 2 November 1963) is a German former fencer. He won a silver medal in the individual foil event for East Germany at the 1988 Summer Olympics. Four years later, he won a gold in the team foil event for Germany at the 1992 Summer Olympics.

References

External links
 

1963 births
Living people
People from Bautzen
People from Bezirk Dresden
German male fencers
Olympic fencers of East Germany
Olympic fencers of Germany
Fencers at the 1988 Summer Olympics
Fencers at the 1992 Summer Olympics
Olympic gold medalists for Germany
Olympic silver medalists for East Germany
Olympic medalists in fencing
Medalists at the 1988 Summer Olympics
Medalists at the 1992 Summer Olympics
Recipients of the Patriotic Order of Merit in silver
Sportspeople from Saxony